Julian Hurtado (born November 24, 1979) is a Colombian footballer who currently plays for Mineros de Guayana in Venezuela.

Honors
 Champions Colombian Primera A, 2006 Cúcuta Deportivo
 Semifinalist of Copa Libertadores, 2007 Cúcuta Deportivo

External links
 BDFA profile

1979 births
Living people
Colombian footballers
Alianza Petrolera players
Cortuluá footballers
Once Caldas footballers
Cúcuta Deportivo footballers
Deportes Tolima footballers
A.C.C.D. Mineros de Guayana players
Categoría Primera A players
Colombian expatriate footballers
Expatriate footballers in Venezuela
Association football defenders
Sportspeople from Valle del Cauca Department
20th-century Colombian people
21st-century Colombian people